Princeville may refer to:

 Princeville, Hawaii, US
 Princeville, Illinois, US
 Princeville, North Carolina, US
 Princeville, Québec, Canada

See also

 Prince (disambiguation)
 Ville (disambiguation)
 
 Fort Prince 
 Prince County
 Princeton (disambiguation)
 Princetown (disambiguation)